Priscilla Andreia Stevaux Carnaval (born 2 December 1993, in Sorocaba) is a Brazilian female  BMX rider, representing her nation at international competitions. She has been part of the Brazilian team since 2010, and the following year she was sixth in the junior category of the 2011 UCI BMX World Championships. Carnaval has since competed in the Elite Women category of the UCI BMX World Championships in 2012, 2015  and 2016, and represented her country in the 2016 Olympics Brazil hosted.

She represented Brazil at the 2020 Summer Olympics.

References

External links
 Priscilla Andreia Stevaux Carnaval at UCI
 
 
 
 
 

1993 births
Living people
BMX riders
Brazilian female cyclists
Brazilian BMX riders
Olympic cyclists of Brazil
Cyclists at the 2016 Summer Olympics
Cyclists at the 2020 Summer Olympics
Pan American Games competitors for Brazil
Cyclists at the 2015 Pan American Games
Cyclists at the 2019 Pan American Games
People from Sorocaba
Sportspeople from São Paulo (state)
21st-century Brazilian women
20th-century Brazilian women